William Forsell Kirby (14 January 1844 – 20 November 1912) was an English entomologist and folklorist.

Life
He was born in Leicester. He was the eldest son of Samuel Kirby, who was a banker.  He was educated privately, and became interested in butterflies and moths at an early age. The family moved to Brighton, where he became acquainted with Henry Cooke, Frederick Merrifield and J. N. Winter. He published the Manual of European Butterflies in 1862.

In 1867 he became a curator in the Museum of the Royal Dublin Society, and produced a Synonymic Catalogue of Diurnal Lepidoptera (1871; Supplement 1877).

In 1879 Kirby joined the staff of the British Museum (Natural History) as an assistant, after the death of Frederick Smith. He published a number of catalogues, as well as Rhopalocera Exotica (1887–1897) and an Elementary Text-book of Entomology. He also did important work on orthopteroid insects including a three volume Catalogue of all known species (1904, 1906, 1910). He retired in 1909.

Kirby had a wide range of interests, knew many languages and fully translated Finland's national epic, the Kalevala, from Finnish into English. Kirby's translation, which carefully reproduces the Kalevala meter, was a major influence on the writings of J.R.R. Tolkien, who first read it in his teens. Kirby also provided many footnotes to Sir Richard Burton's translation of the Arabian Nights.

A short biography of Kirby, with particular reference to his work on phasmids, was published by P. E. Bragg in 2007.

Evolution
Kirby was an advocate of theistic evolution. In his book Evolution and Natural Theology, he argued that evolution and theism are compatible. He noted that creationism was scientifically untenable and refuted its arguments. He viewed nature as a "vast self-adjusting machine".

Publications

Entomology 

 

Collaborative works, and other acknowledgements

, with index

 , index and introductions
 , index and introductions

Other biology

Literary 

 , translator and editor

 , compiled and translated from Estonian and German
 , translator
 , translator

Notes

Further reading
The Natural History Museum at South Kensington by William T. Stearn

External links

 
 
 
 

1844 births
1912 deaths
19th-century translators
Critics of creationism
Employees of the Natural History Museum, London
English lepidopterists
Irish entomologists
People from Leicester
Theistic evolutionists
Translators from Finnish